Nargesleh (also Romanized as Nargesaleh) is a village in Chehel Cheshmeh Rural District, in the Central District of Divandarreh County, Kurdistan Province, Iran. At the 2006 census, its population was 23, in 5 families. The village is populated by Kurds.

References 

Towns and villages in Divandarreh County
Kurdish settlements in Kurdistan Province